Juda may refer to:

People
 Adele Juda (1888–1949), Austrian psychologist and neurologist
 Annely Juda (1914–2006), German art dealer 
 Elsbeth Juda (1911–2014), British photographer 
 Paul Juda (born 2001), American artistic gymnast

Other uses
 Juda, Wisconsin, an unincorporated community in the U.S.
 Juda, a chieftain of Bikini Atoll before Operation Crossroads
 "Juda", a 2003 song by Mizar (band)
 "Juda", a song by Rebecca F. from the 1999 EP It's All About You

See also

Judah (disambiguation)
Ouidah, or Whydah, a port city in Benin